Wallace & Gromit is a British stop-motion comedy franchise created by Nick Park of Aardman Animations. The series consists of four short films and one feature-length film, and has spawned numerous spin-offs and TV adaptations. The series centres on Wallace, a good-natured, eccentric, cheese-loving inventor, and Gromit, his loyal and intelligent anthropomorphic beagle. The first short film, A Grand Day Out, was finished and made public in 1989. Wallace was voiced by actors Peter Sallis and Ben Whitehead. Gromit is largely silent and has no dialogue, communicating through facial expressions and body language.

Because of their widespread popularity, the characters have been described as positive international cultural icons of both modern British culture and British people in general. BBC News called them "some of the best-known and best-loved stars to come out of the UK". Icons has said they have done "more to improve the image of the English world-wide than any officially appointed ambassadors". Although not overtly set in any particular town, Park has hinted that it was inspired by 1950s Wigan in Northern England. Wallace's accent comes from the Holme Valley of West Yorkshire. Wallace is fond of Wensleydale cheese (from Wensleydale, North Yorkshire).

Their films have received universal acclaim, with the first three short films, A Grand Day Out (1989), The Wrong Trousers (1993) and A Close Shave (1995) earning 100% on Rotten Tomatoes; the feature film Wallace & Gromit: The Curse of the Were-Rabbit (2005) has also received acclaim. The feature film is the second-highest-grossing stop-motion animated film, only outgrossed by Chicken Run (2000), another creation of Park's. A fourth short film, A Matter of Loaf and Death, was released in 2008. The franchise has received numerous accolades, including five British Academy Film Awards, three Academy Awards and a Peabody Award.

The Wallace and Gromit characters spearhead the fundraising for two children's charities: Wallace & Gromit's Children's Foundation, which supports children's hospices and hospitals in the United Kingdom, and Wallace and Gromit's Grand Appeal, the charity for Bristol Children's Hospital in Bristol, England. In December 2010, Wallace and Gromit featured on a festive themed series of UK postage stamps issued by the Royal Mail.

History
The first short film, A Grand Day Out, was nominated for the Academy Award for Best Animated Short Film in 1991, but lost to Creature Comforts, another animated creation of Nick Park. The short films The Wrong Trousers and A Close Shave followed. The full-length feature The Curse of the Were-Rabbit was released in 2005. The latter three each earned Academy Awards.

In January 2007, a five-film deal with DreamWorks and Aardman fell through after only three films, due to creative differences, as well as the box office failure of Flushed Away. Park said later that DreamWorks executives wanted to Americanise the very British Wallace and Gromit after test screenings, which would have tarnished some of the duo's nostalgic charm. The fourth Wallace and Gromit short, A Matter of Loaf and Death, was Park's first production since the end of the DreamWorks deal. It was the most-watched television programme in the UK in 2008. A Matter of Loaf and Death won the 2008 BAFTA Award for Best Short Animation and was nominated for an Academy Award in 2010. In 2013, Peter Lord stated that there were no plans at the moment for a new short film, and Park announced in the following year that the declining health of Wallace's voice actor, Peter Sallis, had the possibility of preventing any future films despite the availability of Ben Whitehead.
On 4 May 2017, Lord stated that more projects with the characters are likely while speaking at an animation event in Stuttgart, Germany. He said, "When Nick [Park]'s not drawing cavemen, he's drawing Wallace & Gromit ... I absolutely assume he will do another, but not a feature. I think he found it was too much. I think he liked the half-hour format."

Sallis died on 2 June 2017 at the age of 96. In 2018, Park said to Radio Times: "[Sallis] was such a special one-off person with such unique qualities, it would be hard to fill his shoes but I think he'd want us to carry on and I've got more Wallace and Gromit ideas." In 2019, Park announced that a new Wallace and Gromit project is in development. "I can't give too much away because it would spoil it really, but it's Wallace & Gromit up to their old antics." In May 2020, Aardman announced the release of The Big Fix Up, a Wallace & Gromit story in the form of an augmented reality (AR) mobile app. It features the voices of Miriam Margolyes, Isy Suttie and Jim Carter and was released on 18 January 2021.

In September 2021, a bronze bench statue of Wallace and Gromit was unveiled in Preston, Lancashire, Park's home town.

In January 2022, a new film was announced, which is due to release in 2024 on Netflix worldwide, except for the UK where it will premiere first on the BBC before also coming to Netflix at a later date.

Overview

Wallace
Wallace lives at 62 West Wallaby Street, Wigan, along with his pet dog Gromit. His surname is unknown. He usually wears a white shirt, brown wool trousers, a green knitted pullover, and a red tie. He is fond of cheese, especially Wensleydale, and crackers.

Nick Park, his creator, said: "He's a very self-contained figure. A very homely sort who doesn't mind the odd adventure." He is loosely based on Park's father.

Wallace was voiced by Peter Sallis until 2010, and Ben Whitehead since 2005.

Wallace is an inveterate inventor, creating elaborate contraptions that often do not work as intended. Their appearance is similar to the illustrations of W. Heath Robinson and Rube Goldberg, and Nick Park has said of Wallace that all his inventions are designed around the principle of using a "sledgehammer to crack a nut". Some of Wallace's contraptions are based on real-life inventions. For example, his method of waking up in the morning uses a bed that tips over to wake up its owner, an invention that was exhibited at the Great Exhibition of 1851 by Theophilus Carter.

Wallace's official job varies; in A Close Shave, he is a window cleaner. In The Curse of the Were-Rabbit, Wallace runs a humane pest-control service, keeping the captured creatures (nearly all of which are rabbits) in the basement of his house. In the most recent short, A Matter of Loaf and Death, he is a baker. While he has shown himself to be skilled to some degree in the businesses he creates, an unexpected flaw in the inventions he uses to assist him in his latest venture or simple bad luck often ends up being his downfall.

In the first photo shown on The Curse of the Were-Rabbit, it was revealed that Wallace once had a full head of hair and a very thick moustache with muttonchops. On the photo that shows Gromit's graduation at Dogwarts, he had lost his beard, but still had a little hair, in the form of side burns just above his ears. In The Wrong Trousers, he still uses a hair-dryer. In A Matter of Loaf and Death, when Wallace is talking to Gromit, a picture is seen behind Gromit of Wallace with a brown beard and brown hair.

Wallace has had three love interests. The first was Wendolene Ramsbottom, which ended quickly when Wendolene told Wallace that cheese gives her a rash. The second was Lady Tottington in The Curse of the Were-Rabbit, whom Wallace fondly calls "Totty". In A Matter of Loaf and Death, Wallace becomes engaged to Piella Bakewell, who turns out to be a serial killer.

Gromit

Gromit is a beagle who is Wallace's pet dog and best friend. He is very intelligent, having graduated from "Dogwarts University" ("Dogwarts" being a pun on "Hogwarts", the wizard school from the Harry Potter books) with a double first in Engineering for Dogs. He likes knitting, playing chess, reading the newspaper, tea and cooking. His prized possessions include his alarm clock, dog bone, brush, and a framed photo of himself with Wallace. He is very handy with electronic equipment and an excellent aeroplane pilot. He often threatens the plans of the villains he and Wallace encounter in their adventures. Sometimes, Gromit ignores Wallace's orders, such as in A Close Shave and Shopper 13, where Wallace orders him to get rid of Shaun, but Gromit does not. Gromit's birthday is 12 February. In The Wrong Trousers, he is seen circling the date on a calendar.

Gromit has no visible mouth and expresses himself through facial expressions and body language. Peter Hawkins originally intended to voice Gromit, but Park dropped the idea when he realised how Gromit's thoughts and feelings could be known through movement with some canine noises on rare occasions. Many critics believe that Gromit's silence makes him the perfect straight man, with a pantomime expressiveness that drew favourable comparisons to Buster Keaton. He does at times make dog-like noises, such as yelps and growling.

Generally speaking, Gromit's tastes are more in vogue than those of Wallace; this being one of the many ways they contrast with each other as characters. Gromit seems to have a significant interest in encyclopaedic, classical and philosophical literature, and popular culture, including film and music. Electronics for Dogs has been a firm favourite since A Grand Day Out, and in The Wrong Trousers Gromit's bookshelves feature titles such as Kites, Sticks, Sheep, Penguins, Rockets, Bones and Stars, while he is seen reading The Republic, by Pluto (a nod to the Disney character of the same name and a pun on Plato) and Crime and Punishment, by Fido Dogstoyevsky (a pun on Fyodor Dostoyevsky). Gromit's various possessions make extensive use of puns: A Matter of Loaf and Death features "Pup Fiction" (Pulp Fiction), "The Dogfather" (The Godfather), "Where Beagles Dare" (Where Eagles Dare), "Bite Club" (Fight Club) and "The Bone Identity" (The Bourne Identity) all as book titles, and "Citizen Canine" (Citizen Kane) as a film poster. His taste in music has been shown to cover Bach, "Poochini" (a play on Puccini), "McFlea" (McFly), "The Beagles" (the Beatles) and "Red Hot Chili Puppies" (Red Hot Chili Peppers).

Gromit gains his own love interest in A Matter of Loaf and Death, when he becomes attached to Fluffles, a poodle. Fluffles reciprocates his affection and joins Wallace and Gromit delivering bread at the end of the film, and the three drive off into the sunset, making a delivery and listening to "Puppy Love" (performed, according to the record cover, by "Doggy Osmond").

NASA named one of its new prototype Mars explorer robots after Gromit in 2005. On 1 April 2007, HMV announced that Gromit would stand in for Nipper for a three-month period, promoting children's DVDs in its UK stores.

Location

Although not overtly setting the series in any particular town, Nick Park had previously hinted that its milieu was inspired by thoughts of 1950s Wigan, reinforced by an A–Z Wigan being displayed on Wallace's Anti-Pesto van in The Curse of the Were-Rabbit. In The Wrong Trousers, Gromit picks up a letter at the Wallace and Gromit residence addressed to "62 West Wallaby Street, Wigan". The address includes a postcode of WG7 7FU, though this does not match any street in Wigan, whose postcodes begin with the letters WN. This address can be seen in the Cracking Contraptions episode "Shopper 13".

Wallace's accent (voiced by Peter Sallis) comes from the Holme Valley of West Yorkshire.

In the Cracking Contraptions episode "The Soccamatic", Wallace says to Gromit, "How do you like my Preston North End soccamatic, Gromit?". The episode references famous English footballers of the 1950s and '60s, including Nobby Stiles, Tom Finney and Bill Shankly (all of whom played for Preston in their careers) as well as Geoff Hurst and Stanley Matthews.

The nostalgic quality of Wallace and Gromit's world has been compared to 1950s Beanotown.

Filmography

Main series

Spin-off films

Television series

Box office and reception

Box office performance

Critical and public reception

Academy Awards

Production

Stop motion technique
The Wallace and Gromit films are shot using the stop motion animation technique. After detailed storyboarding, set and plasticine model construction, the films are shot one frame at a time, moving the models of the characters slightly to give the impression of movement in the final film. As is common with other animation techniques, the stop motion animation in Wallace and Gromit may duplicate frames if there is little motion, and in action scenes sometimes multiple exposures per frame are used to produce a faux motion blur. Because a second of film constitutes 24 separate frames, even a short half-hour film like A Close Shave takes a great deal of time to animate. General quotes on the speed of animation of a Wallace and Gromit film put the filming rate at typically around 30 frames per day per animator. The feature-length The Curse of the Were-Rabbit took 15 months to make.

Some effects, particularly the fire, smoke and floating bunnies in The Curse of the Were-Rabbit, proved impossible to create in stop motion and were rendered by computer animation specialists, MPC film. MPC film studied the set for three months in order to create clay-like animation to match the stop-motion production. By paying close attention to detail, MPC was able to make the animated bunnies blend in with the clay bunnies. Adding imperfections such as fingerprints along with texture to the animated bunnies helped enhance the effect. MPC's collaboration resulted in over 700 effects to aid the film along with colouring to match the visuals.

Most models were destroyed in the 2005 Aardman studio fire, but a set from A Matter of Loaf and Death is presently on display at the At-Bristol science centre. The set and several props from the museum featured in The Wrong Trousers survived as well, as they were being kept at the National Science and Media Museum in Bradford, West Yorkshire, before the fire occurred.

Music
The music featured in every film was written by British film composer Julian Nott. The theme song was used to wake up astronauts aboard space shuttle mission STS-132 in May 2010. It has been suggested on BBC Radio 4's PM that the theme should become the England football supporters' song, instead of the main title theme of The Great Escape.

Other media

Video games
A Wallace and Gromit interactive CD-ROM game from 1996, named Wallace & Gromit Fun Pack, was released for the PC, containing the Crackin' Compendium with three mini-games based on the three original animated shorts as well as brief video clips. The other program in the Fun Pack the Customise-O-Matic contained wallpapers, screen savers and sounds that could be assigned as system sounds. A sequel Fun Pack 2 was released in 2000 featuring enhanced graphics and two new games as well as a remake of the Great Train Game.

The characters were associated with a 144-issue fortnightly digest called Techno Quest, published by Eaglemoss Publications starting in 1997. It was designed to get children interested in science and technology.

In 1997 an animated screensaver themed video game entitled Wallace & Gromit Cracking Animator was released. Screensaver games were made by Dibase. Players could create their own multimedia animations through the collation of things like sound effects, sets, characters and props. Players could manipulate the facial movements of characters in order to synchronise their expressions with dialogue. Players could choose to make their finished creation their screensaver, or choose one of the pre-made screensaver games. The manual can be found at the British Library. The Boston Herald offered a rating of 2.5 stars, noting that creativity is limited.

In September 2003, Wallace & Gromit in Project Zoo was released for the PlayStation 2, Xbox, GameCube, and Microsoft Windows. This separate story sees the duo take on Feathers McGraw (of The Wrong Trousers) again. Still obsessed with diamonds, he escapes from the penguin enclosure of West Wallaby Zoo, where he was "imprisoned" at the end of The Wrong Trousers, and takes over the entire zoo, kidnapping young animals and forcing their parents to work for him, helping him turn the zoo into a diamond mine. Wallace and Gromit, meanwhile, have adopted one of the zoo's baby polar bears, named Archie. As they go to visit the zoo to celebrate his birthday, they find it closed. A quick spot of inventing back at the house, and they prepare to embark on their latest adventure. Hiding inside a giant wooden penguin, they infiltrate the zoo, and set about rescuing the animals. In 2005, a video game of The Curse of The Were-Rabbit was released for PlayStation 2 and Xbox, following the plot of the film as Wallace and Gromit work as vermin-catchers, protecting customers' vegetable gardens from rabbits, using a "BunGun". Gameplay for the Project Zoo involve players exclusively controlling Gromit, as Wallace functions as a helper non-player character, but in The Curse of the Were-Rabbit, gameplay shifts between the two, and includes two-player cooperative play. Both games were developed by Frontier Developments with the assistance of Aardman, with Peter Sallis reprising his role as Wallace. Project Zoo was published by BAM! Entertainment, while The Curse of the Were-Rabbit was published by Konami.

In July 2008, developer Telltale Games announced a new series of episodic video games based on the characters, called Wallace & Gromit's Grand Adventures. The first episode in Grand Adventures, "Fright of the Bumblebees", was released on 23 March 2009. The second episode, "The Last Resort", was released on 5 May 2009. Two more episodes, "Muzzled!" and "The Bogey Man", were released in later 2009. The four episodes have separately been released on Xbox Live Arcade for the Xbox 360.

List of video games

There are also several games on the Wallace & Gromit, Shaun the Sheep and Timmy Time website.

Comic
British publisher Titan Magazines started producing a monthly Wallace and Gromit comic after the debut of Curse of the Were-Rabbit. The characters still run Anti-Pesto, and both Shaun and Feathers McGraw have appeared in the comic.

The two characters appeared in the monthly BeanoMAX comic until its closure in June 2013, and now appear every four weeks in The Beano. They are heavily featured in 'Aardmag', the free online magazine that is unofficial but supported by Aardman Animations. Nick Park guest-edited the 70th birthday issue of The Beano weekly, and so this issue contained numerous Wallace and Gromit references.

On 17 May 2010, they began appearing daily in The Sun. It is credited to Titan and Aardman, with scripts written by Richy Chandler, Robert Etherington, Mike Garley, Ned Hartley, Rik Hoskin, David Leach, Luke Paton, J.P. Rutter, Rona Simpson and Gordon Volke, art by Sylvia Bennion, Jay Clarke, Jimmy Hansen, Viv Heath, Mychailo Kazybrid and Brian Williamson. It replaced George and Lynne. A graphic novel compiling all 311 daily strips was released on 8 October 2013, and a second volume followed on 4 November 2014. A third volume was released on 25 March 2015, and a fourth volume was released on 9 September 2015.

List of comics

Theatre
In November 1997 the characters appeared in a play called Wallace And Gromit™ Alive on Stage in a Grand Night Out.

On 9 March 2011, Shaun the Sheep made its live theatre début in Shaun's Big Show. The 100-minute-long musical/dance show features all the regular characters, including Bitzer, Shirley and Timmy.

In 2015, Shaun starred in Snow White and the Seven Dwarfs pantomime at Bristol Hippodrome.

Additional crew

Promotional appearances
In 2003, Aardman produced a cinematic commercial for the Renault Kangoo starring Wallace and Gromit. The ad played in front of several summer blockbusters in top British cinemas. The commercial, entitled "The Kangoo-matic", was Wallace and Gromit's first advertisement. Later Wallace and Gromit commercials were made for Jacob's Cream Crackers, energy supplier Npower and beverage PG Tips.

The duo were used to promote a Harvey Nichols store that opened in Bristol (where Aardman is based) in 2008. The pictures show them, and Lady Tottington from Wallace & Gromit: The Curse of the Were-Rabbit, wearing designer clothes and items. They were used to prevent a Wensleydale cheese factory from shutting down because of financial difficulties after a member of staff came up with the idea of using Wallace and Gromit as mascots, as Wensleydale is one of Wallace's favourite cheeses.

On 28 March 2009, The Science Museum in London opened an exhibition called "Wallace & Gromit present a World of Cracking Ideas". The family-oriented show, open until 1 November 2009, hoped to inspire children to be inventive. Wallace and Gromit were featured in many exhibition-exclusive videos, as well as one announcing the opening of the exhibition.

In December 2010, Wallace and Gromit featured on series of UK postage stamps issued by the Royal Mail for Christmas. The same month, Nick Park appeared on BBC Radio 4’s Desert Island Discs and announced that he was working with Pleasure Beach Blackpool to build a theme park ride based on the characters. The Wallace & Gromit: The Thrill-O-Matic dark ride opened at Pleasure Beach Blackpool in 2013.

Wallace and Gromit appeared in a one-minute special for the Diamond Jubilee of Elizabeth II called Jubilee Bunt-a-thon. In 2012, Wallace and Gromit featured on an advert saying "Inventing For Britain" which was part of a poster campaign to promote British trade and business aboard in the year they hosted the Olympics. 

In August 2012, they presented an edition of The BBC Proms, Wallace & Gromit's Musical Marvels, as Prom 20 of the 2012 season. Because of its popularity, Wallace & Gromit's Musical Marvels became a full touring show in 2013. It premièred at The Plenary in Melbourne, Australia on 9 February 2013. It was performed at other venues throughout 2013, with A Matter of Loaf and Death screened at each performance.

In 2013 and 2014 the pair appeared in a nationwide TV, press and cinema campaign promoting the British government's "Holidays at Home are Great" directive, called Wallace & Gromit's Great UK Adventure.

In December 2019, they appeared in a DFS advert created by Krow to celebrate their 30th anniversary. Helena Bonham Carter reprised her role as Lady Tottington with new dialogue for this advert.

Charity
Wallace and Gromit spearhead the fundraising for two children's charities, Wallace & Gromit's Children's Foundation, which supports children's hospices and hospitals in the United Kingdom, and Wallace and Gromit's Grand Appeal, the Bristol Children's Hospital Charity. In July 2013, 80 giant fibreglass decorated sculptures of Gromit were distributed around Bristol as part of a Nick Park-inspired project to raise funds for the charity. The project is named Gromit Unleashed and sculptures were decorated by a range of artists and celebrities, including Joanna Lumley, Sir Peter Blake, Trevor Baylis and Jools Holland. A similar project featuring Shaun the Sheep called Shaun in the City was in 2015. A third was placed in 2018 called Gromit Unleashed 2, also featuring Wallace & Shaun. In 2020 Gromit Unleashed: The Grand Adventure will be in The Mall, Cribbs Causeway featuring 15 sculptures of Wallace, Gromit, Shaun and Feathers.

Theme park ride

A theme park ride called Wallace & Gromit's Thrill-O-Matic opened at Blackpool Pleasure Beach on 29 April 2013 by creator Nick Park, Amanda Thompson, Nick Thompson, Nick Farmer and Merlin Crossingham.

The ride, which cost £5.25 million to make, was created by Blackpool Pleasure Beach design in association with Aardman Animations. The cars on the ride are designed on one of Wallace's slippers, so that, when a rider is seated, it is as if they are sitting inside a large slipper. The ride lasts almost four minutes, and features scenes from A Grand Day Out, The Wrong Trousers, A Close Shave, The Curse of the Were-Rabbit and A Matter of Loaf and Death along with some archive audio and some newly recorded lines from Ben Whitehead as the voice of Wallace.

Spin-offs

Shaun the Sheep (2007–present) 

In 2007, a spin-off series Shaun the Sheep was created for the character of Shaun, first introduced in 1995's A Close Shave. In the series, Shaun lives with his flock at Mossy Bottom Farm, a traditional small northern English farm. In each episode, their latest attempt to add excitement to their dull mundane life as livestock somehow snowballs into a fantastic sitcom-style escapade, most often with the help of their fascination with human doings and devices. This usually brings them into conflict—and often into partnership—with the farm sheepdog Bitzer, while they all are simultaneously trying to avoid discovery by the Farmer. Following the success of the series, two series of 1-minute shorts were created – Mossy Bottom Shorts and Championsheeps—followed by a television special The Farmer's Llamas (2015) and two feature films, Shaun the Sheep Movie (2015) and A Shaun the Sheep Movie: Farmageddon (2019).

Timmy Time (2009–12) 

In 2009, a spin-off of Shaun the Sheep, Timmy Time, was created centring on the character of the same name. In the series, Timmy and his friends have to learn to share, make friends and accept their mistakes. They are supervised by two teachers, Harriet the Heron and Osbourne the Owl. The show is aimed at pre-school-aged children which the company described as "a natural step for Aardman".

References

External links

 
 Wallace & Gromit’s Children's Charity
 BBC One – Wallace and Gromit's World of Invention

 
Fictional English people
Fictional inventors
Fictional dogs
Fictional duos
Peabody Award winners
Animated duos
BBC Television shows
Clay animation
Stop motion characters
Animated human characters
Films adapted into television shows
Films adapted into comics
Film characters introduced in 1989
Aardman Animations